The 2019 BBL Playoffs were the concluding postseason of the 2018–19 Basketball Bundesliga season. The Playoffs started on 18 May and ended 23 June 2019.

Bracket

All times are local (UTC+2).

Quarterfinals
The quarterfinals were played in a best of five format from 18 to 28 May 2019.

Bayern Munich vs Basketball Löwen Braunschweig

EWE Baskets Oldenburg vs Telekom Baskets Bonn

Alba Berlin vs ratiopharm Ulm

Rasta Vechta vs Brose Bamberg

Semifinals
The semifinals were played in a best of five format from 2 to 9 June 2019.

Bayern Munich vs Rasta Vechta

EWE Baskets Oldenburg vs Alba Berlin

Finals
The finals were played in a best of five format from 16 to 23 June 2019.

References

External links
Official website 

BBL Playoffs
2018–19 in German basketball leagues